This list of Norwegian bandy champions shows all champions since the start. Championship for men's teams have been played since 1912, championship for women's teams have been played since 1984.

The winner of the men's teams championship is given a trophy called kongepokal ("king's cyp"). The team having won the most championships is Stabæk IF, having won 20 championships including the one in 2014, overtaking Drafn’s 19 that year.

The Norwegian Bandy Premier League (Eliteserien) has been played since 1932 and consists (for the time being) of eight teams. After the regular league, the six leading of the league teams go to a play-off which decides what team will be the Norwegian champion.

From the start in 1912, bandy in Norway was played with seven players on each team and was called «ishockey» (literally "ice hockey"), but the sport was actually bandy. Starting in 1929, eleven-man teams have been used, just as in other countries, and the same year Norges Ishockeyforbund was renamed Norges Bandyforbund.

Norwegian champions

7-a side bandy 1912–1928

11-a side bandy since 1929

Notes

Titles

Men's and women's titles the same year

References

Bandy in Norway
Norway